Priyambada Mohanty Hejmadi is a scientist, academician and an Indian classical dancer of Odissi, art writer, and a biologist.. Born on 18 November 1939, she secured a master's degree and subsequently, obtained a doctoral degree in zoology from the University of Michigan, Ann Arbor, USA. She also mastered in Odissi from an early age under Ban Bihari Maiti and her Odissi performance at the Inter-University Youth Festival in New Delhi in 1954 is reported to have helped the dance form to gain international attention through Charles Fabri, the renowned art critic from Hungary, who was present at the function.

Priyambada is a Fellow of the Indian Academy of Sciences. She has written numerous articles and books such as, Odissi: An Indian Classical Dance Form, elaborating the history and evolution of the Indian classic form of Odissi. "A study of ecology, breeding patterns, development and karyotype patterns" elaborating patterns of the olive ridley, Lepidochelys Olivacea of Gahirmatha of Orissa.

She is a recipient of the "Odissi Nrutya Sanman" which she received in 2013. The Government of India awarded her the fourth highest civilian award of the Padma Shri in 1998 for her contributions towards the fields of science and technology.

See also 

 Odissi
 Sambalpur University

References

Further reading 
 

Recipients of the Padma Shri in science & engineering
1939 births
20th-century Indian biologists
Indian art historians
Indian women historians
20th-century Indian historians
Fellows of the Indian Academy of Sciences
Heads of universities and colleges in India
Indian female classical dancers
Odissi exponents
Living people
Performers of Indian classical dance
Writers from Odisha
Women art historians
Indian women biologists
Scientists from Odisha
20th-century Indian women scientists
20th-century Indian dancers
20th-century Indian women artists
Dancers from Odisha
Women scientists from Odisha
Women artists from Odisha
21st-century Indian women artists
21st-century Indian dancers
Scholars from Odisha
Recipients of the Sangeet Natak Akademi Award
21st-century Indian women scientists
21st-century Indian biologists
21st-century Indian historians
Sambalpur University alumni